The 2005 Coca-Cola GM was the 35th edition of the Greenlandic Men's Football Championship. The final round was held in Uummannaq from August 25 to 30. It was won by B-67 Nuuk for the fifth time in its history.

Qualifying stage

North Greenland
Umanak BK 68 and Eqaluk-56 qualified for the final Round.

NB FC Malamuk qualified for the final Round as hosts.

Disko Bay
Nagdlunguaq-48, G-44 Qeqertarsuaq and Aasiak-97 qualified for the final Round.

Central Greenland
B-67 Nuuk and Kagssagssuk Maniitsoq qualified for the final Round.

Final round

Pool 1

Pool 2

Playoffs

Semi-finals

Seventh-place match

Fifth-place match

Third-place match

Final

See also
Football in Greenland
Football Association of Greenland
Greenland national football team
Greenlandic Men's Football Championship

References

Greenlandic Men's Football Championship seasons
Green
Green
football